Namibia is an arid country that is regularly afflicted by droughts. Large rivers flow only along its northern and southern borders, but they are far from the population centers. They are also far from the country's mines, which are large water users. In order to confront this challenge, the country has built dams to capture the flow from ephemeral rivers, constructed pipelines to transport water over large distances, pioneered potable water reuse in its capital Windhoek located in the central part of Namibia, and built Sub-Saharan Africa's first large seawater desalination plant to supply a uranium mine and the city of Swakopmund with water. A large scheme to bring water from the Okavango River in the North to Windhoek, the Eastern National Water Carrier, was only partially completed during the 1980s.

Most urban residents have access to drinking water supply, but access lags behind in rural areas. Access to sanitation also considerably lags behind access to drinking water supply. The bulk water supply infrastructure is owned by NamWater, a public entity operating under commercial principles. It sells water to the mining companies, as well as to the municipalities which in turn sell it to urban residents and businesses.

Water resources

Namibia’s climate is hot and dry with erratic rainfall during two rainy seasons in summer. Within Africa its climate is second in aridity only to the Sahara. Namibia shares several large rivers, such as the Orange River in the South, shared with South Africa, as well as the Zambezi and Okavango Rivers in the North, shared with Angola, Zambia and Botswana. But these rivers are far away from the population centers and the cost of tapping them for drinking water supply is prohibitive. Only the Cunene River, which is shared with Angola, provides drinking water for four Northern regions of Namibia. The total average "safe yield" of Namibia’s water resources is estimated at 660 million m3/year, distributed as follows: groundwater 300 million m3/year, ephemeral rivers 200 million m3/year, perennial rivers 150 million m3/year and unconventional sources such as treated wastewater 10 million m3/year.

Groundwater
Groundwater is distributed unevenly over the territory of Namibia, thus making the construction of pipelines necessary to tap their potential. In particular, the coastal area is nearly devoid of groundwater. Recharge in these areas is low and unreliable, groundwater lies at great depths and sometimes is of poor quality. Other areas are favorable, sitting on high-yielding, very productive aquifers that contain more water than farmers and communities presently need. Numerous small springs throughout the country sustain wildlife, man and livestock. Over the past century, more than 100 000 boreholes have been drilled in Namibia. Half of these are still in operation. In 2012 hydro-geologists discovered a huge aquifer in Northern Namibia that could supply the area, where 40% of the population of the country lives, for 400 years. The aquifer, called Ohangwena II, contains about 5 billion cubic meters of water which is up to 10,000 years old. The aquifer is about 300 meters deep and is under pressure, so that its water could be pumped up at a relatively low cost. However, a saline aquifer sits on top of the freshwater aquifer, so that drilling must be done carefully in order to avoid saline intrusion. The aquifer receives some recharge from Angola in the North. Experts recommend that, during normal climatic conditions, water abstraction should be limited to the inflow from the North in order to manage the aquifer on a sustainable basis. However, during extended droughts induced by climate change, the aquifer can be drawn down and serve as an important buffer against drought.

In some areas, groundwater is slightly saline (brackish). In the Omusati Region in Northern Namibia, four small brackish water desalination plants were installed in 2010 as part of the German-Namibian research project CuveWaters. The plants are powered by solar energy and provide between 0.5 and 3.3 m³ of safe drinking water per day, enough to satisfy the basic needs of between 10 and 66 people. At 15 Euro/m3 the cost of desalinating brackish water in these small plants is very high.

Surface water

Many of the ephemeral (seasonally flowing) rivers of the Namibian interior are dammed and, according to the FAO, provide a 95%-assured yield of 96 million m3/year, based on historical rainfall data. These dams have low safe yields in comparison to their total volume, because of uneven flows over time and high evaporation losses. Thus only about half the water from ephemeral rivers is usable. There is surplus water in some dams, e.g. in the Oanob Dam, the Hardap Dam, the Naute Dam and the Friedenau Dam. This surplus water cannot be used because of the remote location of these dams and the comparatively limited local demand.

Namibia suffers from regular droughts, the most recent one hitting the country in 2019.

The water from perennial (permanently flowing) rivers used in Namibia corresponds to the small share of Namibia in its border rivers. The actual abstractions as of 1999 (latest available data) were 23 million m3 from the Cunene River at Ruacana, 49 million m3 from the Orange River at Noordoewer, 22 million m3 from the Okavango River (that flows through Namibia in the Caprivi Strip) at Rundu, and 7 million m3 from the Zambezi River. Namibia has agreements in place with Angola and South Africa about the sharing of the Cunene and Orange Rivers respectively. The water allocation from the Cunene River is 180 million m3 and thus far larger than the amount withdrawn.

Flood and rainwater harvesting
In Northern Namibia rain is relatively abundant, but it falls only during the rainy season, creating temporary natural ponds called Oshanas. At the height of the rainy season the water in these ponds is clear and of good quality. In a pilot project as part of the CuveWaters research program, in the remote village Lipopo in the Southern Oshana region water from an Oshana has been pumped to a storage tank to be used for the irrigation of vegetables during the dry season using a drip irrigation system. In addition, rainwater is being collected from the rooftop of a greenhouse and from the roofs covering the storage ponds. In another village, Epyeshona near Oshakati, only rainwater is collected, both on an individual basis from the rooftops of houses, and on a communal basis from a concrete area on the ground constructed especially for rainwater harvesting. In both cases the water is used for the irrigation of vegetables during the dry season, either in an open filed or in a communal greenhouse.

Seawater desalination
The first large desalination plant in Sub-Saharan Africa was inaugurated by Areva on the 16 April 2010. The Erongo plant is located near Wlotzkasbaken, 30 km north of Swakopmund. Its maximum capacity is 20 million m3 per year but it will initially supply 13 million m3. The Trekkopje mine however never opened due to persistent low uranium prices, hence the plant has a contract to sell water to state-owned service provider Namwater and provides some of the water requirements for the town of Swakopmund. During the 2016 drought Areva offered to sell its plant to the Namibian government for $200 million USD.

Water reuse
Reuse of treated wastewater is practiced in Namibia in many urban areas such as Swakopmund, Walvis Bay, Tsumeb, Otjiwarongo, Okahandja, Mariental, Oranjemund and Windhoek. In most localities, water is reused for irrigation. In Windhoek, reclaimed water is also used for potable uses. Windhoek has been using recovered water for fifty years. Approximately 30% of the city's 400 000 residents' present drinking water supply is made up of reclaimed water. A representative example of direct potable reuse is the case of Windhoek (Namibia, New Goreangab Water Reclamation Plant (NGWRP)), where treated wastewater has been blended with drinking water for more than 45 years. It is based on the multiple treatment barriers concept (i.e. pre-ozonation, enhanced coagulation/dissolved air flotation/rapid sand filtration, and subsequent ozone, biological activated carbon/granular activated carbon, ultrafiltration (UF), chlorination) to reduce associated risks and improve the water quality. Since the year 1968 the capital of Namibia, Windhoek, has used reclaimed wastewater as one of their drinking water sources, which nowadays represent about 14% of the city’s drinking water production. In 2001, the New Goreangab Reclamation Plant (NGWRP) was built by the City of Windhoek and it started to deliver drinking water in 2002 (about 21,000 m3 of water per day).

There is also a pilot project for small-scale reuse of treated wastewater in rural areas in Outapi in Northern Namibia as part of the CuveWaters research project. The wastewater of 1,500 people is collected in vacuum sewers and treated in such a way that pathogens are removed, but nutrients remain to a large extent in the water. The technology is relatively sophisticated for a rural area in a developing country, using upflow anaerobic sludge blanket digestion followed by aerobic treatment using a rotating biological contactor, a microsieve and ultraviolet disinfection. The water is then used to irrigate vegetables for the local market. Community members have been trained in how to operate the facilities and a tariff and billing system has been introduced to recover the operating costs of the plant from users.

Water use and access
 
Total water use in Namibia was estimated at 300 million m3 in 2000. The municipal sector including tourism and industry used 73 million m3 (24 percent), while the bulk of water use is for agriculture and livestock. Only 13 million m3 (4 percent) was used in mining at the time, although this amount has increased due to the development of mining – in particular uranium mining – after 2000. Mining in Namibia makes extensive use of water, which is used for a broad range of activities including in particular mineral processing, but also dust control, slurry transport and the water use of employees. Uranium mining uses large quantities of water for processing using alkali heap leaching. For example, the Trekkopje mine in the Namib desert uses 14 million m3/year of high-quality water that must be free of any salt. Saline water extracted through local wells is used for dust suppression, thus reducing the need for freshwater. Furthermore, some of the wastewater is treated and reused, thus further reducing water demand. Freshwater demand is met from the Erongo Desalination Plant that also supplies neighboring communities. Since the lifetime of the plant (30 years) is longer than the expected lifetime of the mine (12 years), already when the plant was planned it was expected that it would be taken over by NamWater at the closure of the mine.

The UN evaluated in 2011 that Namibia has improved its water access network significantly since independence in 1990. Furthermore, in rural areas access is sometimes limited by the long distance between residences and water points. As a result, many Namibians prefer the traditional wells over the available water points far away.

Water supply and water use in Windhoek

Windhoek is provided with water from three different sources. As of 2006 17 Mio m³ of the water demand was covered by dams around Windhoek, such as the Von Bach Dam, 5.4 Mio m³ from the Goreangab Reclamation Plant and only between 1 and 2 Mio m³ still come from boreholes. The city estimates per capita water consumption at 200 liter per capita per day including industries, businesses and tourism, which is slightly higher than in Europe. An analysis of residential water consumption alone estimated it at 163 liter per capita per day in 2010, with significant differences between neighborhoods. For example, it was 306 liter in high-income neighborhoods in the South-East, while it was only 27 liters in informal settlements in the North. During the severe drought of 2015/16, water users in central Namibia were required to cut usage by up to 30 percent. In April 2016, the city of Windhoek launched a Zero Tolerance to Water Wastage policy, under which it would disconnect or fine on anyone using potable supply to water gardens or wash cars. The Swakoppoort Dam, Von Bach Dam and Omatako Dam, which supply the region, were only filled at 11 percent of their capacity. In May, the Coca-Cola Namibia Bottling Company stopped production due to the severe water shortages.

Responsibility for water supply and sanitation
The Ministry of Agriculture, Water and Forestry is in charge of water resources management, drinking water supply and sanitation in Namibia. Within the Ministry the Department for Water Resources Management and the Department for Rural Water and Sanitation Coordination are in charge of water supply and sanitation.
NamWater is a state-owned bulk water supplier that operates dams, pipelines and water treatment plants throughout the country. Created in 1997, it provides and sells water to mines, as well as to municipalities which in turn distribute and sell the water to households, businesses and offices in their respective service areas. In rural areas, the Directorate of Rural Water Supply of the Ministry of Agriculture, Water and Forestry is in charge of water supply and sanitation.

Infrastructure
NamWater operates 16 dams, 14 water transmission lines (called "water supply networks") and 16 water treatment plants. The transmission lines are as follows:

History

In Windhoek, groundwater was almost the only source of water for until 1958 when a small surface reservoir, the Goreangab Dam, was built downstream from Windhoek. A conventional water treatment plant was also constructed to treat the surface water from this reservoir. In 1960 the Gammams Wastewater Treatment Plant was commissioned near Goreangab Dam, discharging treated wastewater downstream of the reservoir. Subsequently, industrial and domestic effluents at the wastewater treatment plant were separated. The plant treating the domestic wastewater was upgraded so that its effluent could be further treated in the existing water treatment plant.

The water treatment plant was also upgraded, so that it could further treat the treated wastewater in one train, alongside the existing train for the raw water from Goreangab Dam. Thus, the Goreangab Reclamation Plant was born in 1968. Its output was blended with water from the city's well field and was delivered as drinking water to the city's residents. When the city grew further, the municipality started to receive water from the Von Bach Dam 170 km north of Windhoek commissioned in 1970. The 1974 Water Master Plan envisaged The Eastern National Water Carrier to supply water to Namibia's central area from the Okavango River, some 750 kilometers to the north on the Angolan border. Construction of the carrier began in the late 1970s in several phases from South to North, first connecting the von Bach Dam to the newly built Omatako Dam further North over a distance of 94 km, and then connecting the Omataku Dam to Grootfontein over a distance of another 300 km. However, the next and last phase of the scheme connecting Grootfontein to the Okavango River near Rundu was never built. The Omatako Dam, completed in 1981, now only receives flood water and is empty most of the time.

In the 1990s, the city introduced progressive water pricing and educational programs that reduced consumption substantially. When the normal water tariff was put in place again in  1997/98, the  consumption  increased  to  130  liters/person/day. Total per capita consumption including commerce and industry shows a reduction from 322 liters/capita/day in 1990/91 to 201 liters/capita/day in 1997/98. According to a study by the International Union for Conservation of Nature (IUCN), water consumption was lowered in all sectors, which is a major achievement because the reduction in water consumption in public buildings is not easily achieved. These savings postponed new supply infrastructure by about 10 years. But despite all these savings more water was needed. Thus the plant's capacity was almost tripled in 2002, allowing it to provide more than a third of the city's water demand and to relieve overused groundwater resources.

To retain public confidence, water quality at the Goreangab Treatment Plant is monitored on an ongoing basis after every process step. In the event of any quality problems, the plant goes into recycle mode and water is not delivered. According to Pisani "The citizens of Windhoek have over time become used to the idea that potable reuse is included in their water provision process. In fact, they have grown to harbor a fair amount of pride in the fact that their city in many respects leads the world in direct reclamation." The upgrading of the plant was partly funded by the European Investment Bank (EIB) and Germany through KfW development bank. In its ex-post evaluation of the project, KfW noted that the plant faced considerable technical difficulties and temporary shutdowns over a period of seven years until it started to work properly. KfW noted that in the spirit of integrated water resources management more should have been done to reduce the per capita water consumption in Windhoek and to protect the Goreangab Dam from pollution, for example by establishing a protection zone with restricted activities around the reservoir. It also noted that the plant did achieve its objective to relieve pressure on overexploited groundwater resources.

Financial aspects
Namibia spends about 3% of its Gross Domestic Product on the operation expenditures of it water utilities. This is by far the highest percentage of all Sub-Saharan countries. Per capita, Namibia spends about 80US$ annually on water supply and sanitation, other countries in the region spend between 1 and 10 US$. Providing access to utility water in Namibia costs 4,000 US$ per capita on average.

Financing
A large share of these expenses is borne by NamWater. NamWater passes its costs fully on to its customers. Since its inception some customers failed to pay their water bills, resulting in poor financial performance. However, beginning in 2003 the company was turned around financially, including also by cutting costs. Today NamWater refinances itself to a large extent through notes issues in the Namibian stock market. As of 2015, interest paid on five-year notes issued in the same year was 9.05 percent and the company had a BBB rating from the rating agency Fitch.

Tariffs
Water tariffs in Namibia are among the highest in Africa. The first block of the residential water tariff in Windhoek costs N$13.86 (USD 0.92) per cubic metre in 2016. The water tariff includes a fixed monthly charge of N$74.43 (5 USD) which is independent of consumption. The first consumption block includes a basic consumption of 200 liter per household and day, an amount that is high for small households but can be low for large households. Higher consumption is charged at a higher tariff that was N$20.93 per cubic metre (USD 1.40) in 2015. The municipality bills water together with electricity, solid waste collection and the property tax. Residents of informal settlements receive water through public standpipes equipped with prepaid water meters. Prepaid customers pay about USD 1.9 per kiloliter (cubic metre), or about USD 0.038 per 20‐liter container.

Water tariffs in other municipalities vary. Those municipalities that receive bulk water from NamWater, which includes all large municipalities, have to recover the costs of bulk water supply plus the cost of water distribution to the customers through their own networks. A few smaller municipalities that have their own water sources are not subject to this constraint. For example, the municipality of Oranjemund provides water for free and thus has by far the highest water use in the country with an astonishing 2,667 liters/capita/day. Bulk water tariff charged by NamWater vary slightly across the country depending on the cost of supplying a specific location, but these differences are not fully passed on to municipalities. Thus NamWater effectively cross-subsidizes localities with high supply costs with surpluses from localities with lower supply costs.

Sanitation
Compared to the efforts made to improve access to safe water, Namibia is lagging behind in the provision of adequate sanitation. This includes 298 schools that have no toilet facilities. Over 50% of child deaths are related to lack of water, sanitation, or hygiene; 23% are due to diarrhea alone. The UN has identified a "sanitation crisis" in the country.

Apart from residences for upper and middle class households, sanitation is insufficient in most residential areas. Private flush toilets are too expensive for virtually all residents in townships due to their water consumption and installation cost. As a result, access to  improved sanitation has not increased much since independence: In Namibia's rural areas as of 2008 13% of the population had more than basic sanitation, up from 8% in 1990. Many of Namibia's inhabitants have to resort to "flying toilets", plastic bags to defecate which after use are flung into the bush. The use of open areas close to residential land to urinate and defecate is very common and has been identified as a major health hazard.

A National Sanitation Strategy 2010-15 estimated that it would cost N$1.64 billion over five years to reach the strategy's goal through 186 individual initiatives. The strategy also noted that it was unlikely that the government would be able to afford these costs.

See also
 Water supply and sanitation in Sub-Saharan Africa
 Economy of Namibia
 Health in Namibia

References

Notes

Literature

External links 
Ministry of Agriculture, Water and Forestry
NamWater